The Siberian Tiger Introduction Project involves reestablishing populations of the Siberian tiger, also known as the Amur tiger, in their former range and also expanding their range by introducing them as replacements of their genetically similar relative, the extinct Caspian tiger, which inhabited Central and Western Asia. Currently, the Siberian tiger inhabits the cold mountains of the Russian Far East and northern China.

History 
Genetic studies have revealed that Siberian and Caspian tigers are descended from the tiger population that colonized Central Asia about 10,000 years ago. After the end of the last ice age, the common ancestor of Siberian and Caspian Tiger migrated through the path which later became the silk route path, to colonise the steppes and Caspian Hyrcanian mixed forest.

Siberian tigers used to be common on either side of the Amur River in Russia and China, as well as in northeastern Mongolia and South Korea. Caspian tigers lived around the Caspian sea in Azerbaijan, Iran and Turkmenistan, and also further away in Armenia, Georgia and Turkey and Kazakhstan all the way to the Altai Mountains in the East. Caspian tigers reportedly became extinct in the 1970s after many years of hunting, poaching and habitat loss. Siberian tigers lost most of their ranges in Siberia and China and became extinct in the wild of Korea and Mongolia.

Siberian Tiger Project 

The Wildlife Conservation Society (WCS) began working in the Russian Far East in 1992 to help conserve rare umbrella species like Siberian tigers, Amur leopards and Blakiston's fish owls, whose survival ultimately requires the conservation of the forest ecosystem as a whole. The WCS founded the Siberian Tiger Project in cooperation with the Sikhote-Alin Nature Reserve at the same time. 

The goal of the Siberian Tiger Project is to collect the best possible scientific information on tiger behavior and ecology for use in conservation plans. The project has studied Siberian tigers by radio-tracking more than 60 individuals since 1992.

The Siberian Tiger Project combines traditional Russian and international approaches to conduct field research and is the world's longest running radio-telemetry based tiger research and conservation effort.

Introduction efforts 

Introduction projects for Siberian tigers have been proposed for the Middle East, Central Asia and North Asia.

Kazakhstan 
Siberian tigers are set to be introduced to areas in Kazakhstan where Caspian tigers once lived. A national park tentatively known as Caspian Tiger National Park for introduced tigers might be opened in 2019.

The Amu Darya river delta was suggested as a potential site. A feasibility study was initiated to investigate if the area was suitable and if such an initiative would receive support from relevant decision makers. A viable tiger population of about 100 animals would require at least 5,000 km2 (1,930 sq mi) of large tracts of contiguous habitat with rich prey populations. Such a habitat is not available at this stage and also cannot be provided in the short term. The proposed region is therefore unsuitable for introduction at this stage.

The southeastern shore of Lake Balkhash where the Ili River discharges and forms a large delta was also chosen as a suitable habitat. Igor Chestin, director of the Russian branch of the World Wide Fund for Nature (WWF), hopes to reintroduce tigers into the region within the next few years, though there is a need to enlarge the potential prey base by increasing the existing populations of saiga antelope, roe deer and wild boar the area.

On 8 September 2017, the government of Kazakhstan announced the outline of its tiger reintroduction program and signed a memorandum with the WWF for assistance. Tigers will be introduced in the extensive riparian forest along the southeastern shore of Lake Balkhash. On 1 January 2018, the government will designate a new nature reserve in the area to restore the degraded habitat and protect it thereafter. The restoration will include the reintroduction of the locally extinct Asiatic wild ass and Bactrian deer. It will also help protect Lake Balkhash. Conservationist hope to engage local communities in the program to help tackle poaching and other illegal activities.

Iran 
Siberian tigers might be introduced to areas in northern Iran where Caspian tigers once lived. In 2010, a pair of Siberian tigers sent by Russia to Iran's Tehran Zoological Garden (Eram Zoo) in exchange for a pair of Persian leopards were set to be introduced to the Miankaleh peninsula along the southeasternmost shore of the Caspian Sea within the next five years. 

In December 2010, one of the Siberian tigers at the Eram Zoo died due to a feline immunodeficiency virus (FIV) infection. In 2011, Iran requested four more Siberian tigers and invited conservation experts from Russia to support the introduction project for the Caspian Sea coast. Iran received two pairs of Siberian tigers in 2012.

Siberia 

The future introduction of Siberian tigers is planned as part of the ambitious rewilding project at Pleistocene Park in the Kolyma river basin in northern Yakutia, Russia, provided the population of herbivores reaches a size capable of supporting large predators.

A Siberian tiger cub orphaned by poachers was rescued at Primorsky Krai in February 2012. The cub which turned out to be a female was rehabilitated and eventually released back into the wild in May 2013. In 2015, she gave birth to two cubs at Bastak Nature Reserve, becoming the first rehabilitated Siberian tiger to give birth in the wild.

Korea 
North Korea was urged to join Russia and China in saving the Siberian tiger after the latest census revealed that only 562 individuals live in the wild. According to the director of the Amur branch of the WWF, analysis of satellite imagery of North Korea has shown that the northern part of the country has suitable conditions for releasing Siberian tigers. This is supported by the fact that a tigress with two cubs had once crossed the border between Russia and North Korea.

References 

Wildlife conservation
Conservation projects
Conservation-reliant species
Animal reintroduction
Fauna of Siberia
Siberian Tiger Re-population Project